Dara Kristin Hobbs is an American operatic soprano, who has appeared internationally, mostly in European opera houses. Her repertoire has focused on dramatic soprano roles in operas by Wagner and Strauss such as Isolde and Ariadne.

Career 
Born in Williams Bay, Wisconsin, Hobbs studied at Northwestern University, graduating with a Bachelor of Arts in European history in 1994 and Master of Music in 1997. She studied on a scholarship from the American Institute of Musical Studies in Graz in summer 2005, and at the Vocal Arts Symposium in Spoleto, Italy, in summer 2006.

She was a member of the Theater Krefeld und Mönchengladbach from 2007 to 2012, where she performed title roles such as Verdi's Aida, Puccini's Tosca and Suor Angelica, and Ariadne auf Naxos by Richard Strauss. Other major parts included the Countess in Mozart's Il nozze,  Lisa in Tchaikovsky's Pique Dame, and Elisabeth in Verdi's Don Carlos. From 2012, she has worked as a freelance singer.

Hobbs has appeared at the Bayreuth Festival from 2013 as Ortlinde in Die Walküre. She performed at opera houses in Europe and the US, often in parts by Richard Strauss and Richard Wagner. She performed Ariadne at the Leipzig Opera, the Staatsoper Hannover and the Fundação Calouste Gulbenkian in Lisbon. She appeared as Senta in Der fliegende Holländer at the Sarasota Opera in Florida, as Sieglinde in Die Walküre at the Frankfurt Opera, and as Isolde in Tristan und Isolde at Theater Bonn, Theater Chemnitz, Theater Regensburg, Stadttheater Minden,  and at Schloss Neuschwanstein.

The performance in Minden, staged by Matthias von Stegmann and played by the Nordwestdeutsche Philharmonie conducted by Frank Beermann, with Andreas Schager as Tristan, received international recognition. A reviewer from Vienna wrote called her performance sensational and described in detail her voice as well-trained, clear, full, and at the same time mellow and with metal luster in high range ("bestens durchgebildete, klare, große Stimme, zugleich weich, warm, voll und mit Metallklang in den Höhen, wo gefordert"), a voice to express the dramatic situations. She appeared as Brünnhilde in Der Ring in Minden from 2016 to 2019. On 10 July 2021, she appeared in the title role of Beethoven's Fidelio in a concert performance at the Alfred Fischer Hall in Hamm as part of the KlassikSommer Hamm festival. Beermann conducted the Nordwestdeutsche Philharmonie, choir and soloists.

References

External links 
 
 Dara Hobbs Operabase
 
 Artists Corner: Soprano Dara Hobbs sarasotaopera.blogspot.de 2014

American operatic sopranos
Year of birth missing (living people)
Living people
People from Williams Bay, Wisconsin
Northwestern University alumni
Singers from Wisconsin
Classical musicians from Wisconsin
21st-century American women